Carbondale may refer to:

Places
In the United States
Carbondale, California
Carbondale, Orange County, California
Carbondale, Colorado
Carbondale, Georgia
Carbondale, Illinois
Carbondale, Indiana
Carbondale, Kansas
Carbondale, Michigan
Carbondale, Ohio
Carbondale, Tulsa, a neighborhood of Tulsa, Oklahoma
Carbondale, Pennsylvania

Elsewhere
Carbondale, Alberta, a hamlet in Canada